A centered octagonal number is a centered figurate number that represents an octagon with a dot in the center and all other dots surrounding the center dot in successive octagonal layers.  The centered octagonal numbers are the same as the odd square numbers. Thus, the nth odd square number and tth centered octagonal number is given by the formula

The first few centered octagonal numbers are
1, 9, 25, 49, 81, 121, 169, 225, 289, 361, 441, 529, 625, 729, 841, 961, 1089, 1225

Calculating Ramanujan's tau function on a centered octagonal number yields an odd number, whereas for any other number the function yields an even number.

 is the number of 2x2 matrices with elements from 0 to n that their determinant is twice their permanent.

See also
 Octagonal number

References

Figurate numbers